The Owl and the Tree is the 7th studio album of Mother Gong and was released in 1989.

Track listing
 "I Am a Tree" – 4:40
 "Lament" – 3:36
 "Hands" – 3:15
 "Ally" – 4:11
 "La Dea Madrí" – 7:05
 "Owly Song" – 6:36
 "I Am My Own Lover" – 14:31
 "Love Poem" – 4:59
 "Coda Wave" – 2:01

Personnel
 Daevid Allen – vocal, glissando & acoustic guitars
 Gilli Smyth – speaking voice, spacewhisper & stillness
 Harry Williamson – synthesizers, keyboards, vocals
 Robert Calvert – breathing into microphones & saxophones
 Rob George – drums, percussions
 Conrad Henderson – bass guitar
 Tim Ayers – bass guitar
 Wandana Arrowheart – harmonium, voices
 Georgia O'hara – vocals

Production
 Robin Ayling – executive producer
 Paul Younghusband – layout design

References

External links

1989 albums
Gong (band) albums
Daevid Allen albums
Psychedelic music albums by British artists
Space rock albums